Rio Dell (Spanish: Río Dell, meaning "Dell River") is a district of Forestville, California. It was formerly unincorporated community within Sonoma County. It adjoins Steelhead Beach Regional Park, which provides a beach, picnic area, and a small craft launching area.

The main road is River Road, which passes northwest to southeast through Rio Dell.  The next community to the northwest is Hollydale.  The next community to the southeast is Mirabel Park.

References

External links

Unincorporated communities in California
Unincorporated communities in Sonoma County, California